Bessie Holland is an Aboriginal  Australian actress, best known for her role as Stella Radic on the prison drama series Wentworth. Holland also joined an ensemble cast in the upcoming series Wakefield.

Filmography

References

Australian television actresses
Year of birth missing (living people)
Living people
21st-century Australian actresses